Crissolo (Vivaro-Alpine: Criçòl, French: Crusol) is a comune (municipality) in the Province of Cuneo in the Italian region Piedmont, located about  southwest of Turin and about  northwest of Cuneo, on the border with France.

Crissolo borders the following municipalities: Bagnolo Piemonte, Bobbio Pellice, Oncino, Ostana, Pontechianale, Ristolas (France), and Villar Pellice.

A sanctuary dedicated to St. Chiaffredo is located at Crissolo.

References

Cities and towns in Piedmont